William H. Slaughter is an American film and television actor, best known for his roles in The Campaign and Focus. In his free time he works with students that want to become actors and actresses at Launch Model And Talent in Metairie, Louisiana.

Early life
Slaughter was born on June 3, 1980 in New Orleans, Louisiana, and graduated in Drama and Communications from the University of New Orleans. He has been trained at the British American Drama Academy (BADA).

Career
In 2011, Slaughter played Ryan in the action film Colombiana opposite Zoe Saldana, the film was directed by Olivier Megaton and released domestically by TriStar Pictures on August 26, 2011.

In 2012, Slaughter played the role of Dermot in the political comedy film The Campaign along with Will Ferrell and Zach Galifianakis. The film was directed by Jay Roach and released by Warner Bros. Pictures on August 10, 2012.

In 2013, Slaughter played the role of an Ohio State Fair Security Guard named Ben in the crime thriller Parker along with Jason Statham and Jennifer Lopez. The film was directed by Taylor Hackford and released on January 25, 2013 by FilmDistrict. Later he played the role of Trevor 'The Fed' in the thriller The East opposite Brit Marling, Alexander Skarsgård, and Elliot Page. The film was directed by Zal Batmanglij and released domestically on May 31, 2013 by Fox Searchlight Pictures.

In 2014, Slaughter played a role as a Pool Cleaner in the biopic Get on Up, starring Chadwick Boseman and Nelsan Ellis. And he also played a small role of the Hip Sports Reporter in the football drama When the Game Stands Tall, starring Jim Caviezel and Laura Dern. Later the same year he appeared as a guest in the FX's horror series American Horror Story.

In 2015, Slaughter played the role of a Passing Thief in the heist comedy Focus along with Will Smith and Margot Robbie. The film was released by Warner Bros. on February 27, 2015. He also appeared in the SundanceTV's drama series The Red Road.

Slaughter has played the role of Agent Murphy in the live-action superhero film Max Steel, based on the Mattel's toy of same name. Stewart Hendler directed the film, which was released in 2015 by Open Road Films.

Slaughter played Squidward in the comedy Daddy's Home, along with Ferrell and Mark Wahlberg. Sean Anders directed the film, which was released on December 25, 2015 by Paramount Pictures. Slaughter also had supporting roles in the 2015 films American Ultra and The Big Short. He played an NSA staffer in the science fiction film Midnight Special, starring Michael Shannon, Joel Edgerton, and Kirsten Dunst. Jeff Nichols directed the film, released on March 18, 2016 by Warner Bros.

Slaughter played Josiah in the western film The Magnificent Seven, starring Denzel Washington, Chris Pratt and Ethan Hawke. The film was directed by Antoine Fuqua, and was released on September 23, 2016 by Columbia Pictures. He also had a small role in 2017's Geostorm.

Filmography

Film

Television

References

External links

Living people
American male film actors
American male television actors
Male actors from New Orleans
People from New Orleans
University of New Orleans alumni
1980 births
Alumni of the British American Drama Academy
21st-century American male actors